Carl Eduard Verheijen (born 26 May 1975) is a retired Dutch speed skater who specialized in the longer distances 5,000 m and the 10,000 m. Verheijen is the son of international speed skaters Rieneke Demming and Eddy Verheijen. He is in a relationship with retired skater Andrea Nuyt in Leusden. They have a daughter (Manouk, August 2005). Carl's brother Frank Verheijen is a marathon skater.

He won two bronze medals at the 2006 Winter Olympics, in the 10000 m race and in the team pursuit. At the 2002 Winter Olympics, he placed 6th in the 5000 m event.

Records

Personal records

Source

Verheijen has a score of 147.913 points on the Adelskalender

World records

 * together with Erben Wennemars and Mark Tuitert
 ** together with Erben Wennemars and Sven Kramer

World records at a low altitude rink (unofficial)

Tournament overview

Source:

Medals won

Best results
 2007
 Silver medal 10000 m world single distance championships in Salt Lake City
 Bronze medal 5000 m world single distance championships in Salt Lake City
 Bronze medal World Allround Championships in Heerenveen
 Bronze medal European Allround Championships in Collalbo
 Silver medal Dutch allround championships in Heerenveen
 Silver medal 5000 m Dutch single distance championships in Assen
 Silver medal 10000 m Dutch single distance championships in Assen
 2006
 Bronze medal 10000 m 2006 Winter Olympics
 Bronze medal team pursuit 2006 Winter Olympics
 Dutch champion 5000 m in Heerenveen
 Dutch champion 10000 m in Heerenveen
 2005
 Gold medal team pursuit World Single Distance Championships in Inzell together with Erben Wennemars and Mark Tuitert
 Silver medal 10000 m world single distance championships in Inzell
 Bronze medal 5000 m world single distance championships in Inzell
 Silver medal Dutch allround championships in Heerenveen
 2004
 Gold medal 10000 m world single distance championships in Seoul
 Silver medal 5000 m world single distance championships in Seoul
 Bronze medal World Allround Championships in Hamar
 Silver medal European Allround Championships in Heerenveen
 Dutch champion 5000 m in Heerenveen
 Silver medal Dutch allround championships in Eindhoven
 2003
 Gold medal 5000 m Dutch single distance championships in Heerenveen
 World Cup long distance winner
 Silver medal 10000 m Dutch single distance championships in Heerenveen
 Silver medal 10000 m world single distance championships in Berlin
 Bronze medal 5000 m world single distance championships in Berlin
 2002
 Silver medal European Allround Championships in Erfurt
 2001
 Gold medal 10000 m Dutch single distance championships in The Hague
 Silver medal 5000 m world single distance championships in Salt Lake City
 Gold medal 10000 m world single distance championships in Salt Lake City
 2000
 Silver medal 5000 m Dutch single distance championships in Deventer
 1999
 Bronze medal 5000 m Dutch single distance championships in Groningen
 Bronze medal 10000 m Dutch single distance championships in Groningen
 1998
 Silver medal Dutch allround championships in Groningen
 1996
 Bronze medal 10000 m Dutch single distance championships in Groningen

References

External links 
 
  
 Carl Verheijen at SkateResults.com

1975 births
Living people
Dutch male speed skaters
Speed skaters at the 2002 Winter Olympics
Speed skaters at the 2006 Winter Olympics
Olympic speed skaters of the Netherlands
Olympic bronze medalists for the Netherlands
Sportspeople from The Hague
Olympic medalists in speed skating
World record setters in speed skating
Medalists at the 2006 Winter Olympics
Universiade medalists in speed skating
World Allround Speed Skating Championships medalists
Universiade gold medalists for the Netherlands
Competitors at the 1997 Winter Universiade